William Strang, 1st Baron Strang  (2 January 1893 – 27 May 1978) was a British diplomat who served as a leading adviser to the British Government from the 1930s to the 1950s and as Permanent Under-Secretary at the Foreign Office from 1949 to 1953.

Early life and education
Strang was the eldest son of James Strang, a farmer, and his wife Margaret Steven, daughter of William Steven. He was educated at Palmer's School, University College, London and at the Sorbonne.

Military and diplomatic career
Strang was commissioned into the Worcestershire Regiment in 1915 and served in the First World War. He ended the war as a Captain.

In 1919, he joined the Diplomatic Service and served at the British embassy in Belgrade from 1919 to 1922, at the Foreign Office from 1922 to 1930 and at the embassy in Moscow from 1930 to 1933. During his time in Moscow he played an important role in the Metro-Vickers engineers trial, in which six British engineers were accused of spying. He returned to the Foreign Office in 1933, and held office as head of the League of Nations section until 1937 and of the Central Department from 1937 to 1939.

During the 1930s he was an adviser to the government at the major international meetings, and met Mussolini, Hitler and Stalin. He was a tacit opponent of appeasement, but always stayed loyal to the government. From 1939 to 1943 he was assistant under-secretary of state for Europe. During the late-1930s, Strang was a member of the Anglo-German Fellowship, which was pro-Nazi.

Strang became of interest to an undercover MI5 agent, Eric Roberts, who was operating under the pretence of working for the Gestapo, with the intention of identifying potential fifth columnists. In 1943, he reported on one of the diplomat's female friends who was possibly his lover. Unaware of her connections, Strang had told her "that he personally hated the Jews and regarded the Bolsheviks and the Jews as the two greatest enemies of all that is decent". Roberts reported further comments made six days later to the same woman: "Strang alleged that the Bethnal Green tube disaster was caused by a Jewish pickpocket gang, the ringleader of which netted £200". Ultimate responsibility for the Bethnal Green tube disaster in March 1943 was placed on the negligence of the authorities rather than any individuals.

Strang was present at the major conferences between the Allied leaders during the Second World War. In 1943 Strang was appointed the British representative on the European Advisory Commission, with the rank of ambassador. The commission was established by the Allies to study the possible post-war political problems in Europe and make recommendation but was dissolved at the Potsdam Conference. In June 1945, Strang became political adviser to the Commander-in-Chief of British forces in Germany, Bernard Montgomery.

Strang again returned to the Foreign Office in 1947 and served as Permanent Under-Secretary of State for the German section from 1947 to 1949 and as Permanent Under-Secretary of State for Foreign Affairs from 1949 to 1953. The six years Strang served as Permanent Under-Secretary of State saw the gradual recovery of Europe through the Marshall Plan, the establishment of the Western European Union and NATO and the breaking of the Berlin blockade. He retired from the Foreign Office in December 1953 due to ill health, following an incident where he fainted during Queen Elizabeth II's coronation ceremony at Westminster Abbey.

Honours
While serving as an army captain, Strang was appointed a Member of the Order of the British Empire (MBE) in 1918. was made a Companion of the Order of St Michael and St George (CMG) in 1932, a Companion of the Order of the Bath (CB) in 1939, a KCMG in 1943, a GCMG in 1950 and a KCB in 1953. In 1954, he was raised to the peerage as Baron Strang, of Stonesfield in the County of Oxford. He later served as a Deputy Speaker and Deputy Chairman of Committees in the House of Lords and as Convenor of the Crossbench Peers. He was also Chairman of the Royal Institute of International Affairs and of the college committee of University College, London. He published The Foreign Office (1955), Britain in World Affairs (1961) and Diplomatic Career (1962) as well as his autobiography Home and Abroad (1956).

Marriage and issue
In 1920, he married Elsie Wynne Jones, daughter of Josias E. Jones. They had one daughter and one son:

 Colin (12 June 1922 – 19 December 2014), who succeeded him in the barony.
 Jean (17 April 1921 – 21 October 1988)

Because of standing up for Baltic Sea island of Fehmarn (in the meetings of the European Advisory Committee held in London) so that it did not become part of the Soviet occupation zone, as was Stalin's wish, William Strang is highly revered on the island, although he never visited it during his lifetime.

Lord Strang died at the age of 85.

References 

Blake, Lord and Nicholls, C. S (editors). The Dictionary of National Biography, 1971–1980. Oxford: Oxford University Press, 1986.

External links
 
The Papers of William Strang, 1st Baron Strang of Stonesfield, K.C.B. held at Churchill Archives Centre

1893 births
1978 deaths
Alumni of University College London
University of Paris alumni
Worcestershire Regiment officers
British Army personnel of World War I
British people of World War II
Members of HM Diplomatic Service
Members of the Order of the British Empire
Crossbench life peers
Knights Grand Cross of the Order of St Michael and St George
Knights Grand Cross of the Order of the Bath
Permanent Under-Secretaries of State for Foreign Affairs
Place of birth missing
Place of death missing
Hereditary barons created by Elizabeth II
20th-century British diplomats